The 1947 Delaware Fightin' Blue Hens football team was an American football team that represented the University of Delaware as an independent during the 1947 college football season. In its fifth season under head coach William D. Murray, the team compiled a 4–4 record. Walter A. Marusa and John W. Messick were the team captains. The team played its home games at Wilmington Park in Wilmington, Delaware.

Schedule

References

Delaware
Delaware Fightin' Blue Hens football seasons
Delaware Fightin' Blue Hens football